The Fourth Wish is a 1976 Australian family film directed by Don Chaffey based on a three-part 1974 TV drama from the ABC.

Plot
Casey learns that his 12-year-old son Sean has leukaemia and will die in a few months. Casey leaves his job to devote himself to making his son happy, seeing to grant three wishes of Sean: to own a dog, be reunited with his mother, and meet the Queen.

Cast
 John Meillon	 ... 	Casey
 Robert Bettles	... 	Sean
 Michael Craig   ... 	 Dr. Richardson
 Anne Haddy	... 	Dr. Kirk
 Ron Haddrick	... 	Harbord
 Robyn Nevin	... 	Connie
 Julie Hamilton	... 	Jenny
 Brian Anderson	... 	Wally
 Julie Dawson	... 	Hannah
 Edwin Hodgeman	... 	Simms (as Ted Hodgeman)
 Norman Yemm	... 	Specialist
 Brian James	... 	Jarvis
 Don Crosby	... 	Priest
 Cul Cullen	... 	Patcheck
 Gordon McDougall	... 	Policeman

Television mini-series

The original mini series aired in 1974. John Meillion won a Best Actor Logie for his performance.

Production
John Meillon had appeared in the TV show. He formed Galaxy Productions, a company with Michael Craig and Don Chaffey to make the movie.

Shooting began in Adelaide in November 1975 with Robert Bettles replacing Mark Shields as Sean.

See also
 Cinema of Australia

References

External links
 
 
 The Fourth Wish at Oz Movies

1976 films
Australian children's films
Films shot in Adelaide
Films directed by Don Chaffey
1970s English-language films
1970s Australian films